Date Movie is a 2006 American romantic comedy parody film written by Jason Friedberg and Aaron Seltzer, directed by Seltzer, and produced by Paul Schiff and Friedberg. It was released on February 17, 2006 by 20th Century Fox and stars Alyson Hannigan, Adam Campbell, Sophie Monk, Tony Cox, Jennifer Coolidge, Eddie Griffin, and Fred Willard. It is a parody of the romantic comedy film genre, and mostly references My Big Fat Greek Wedding, Meet the Fockers, Hitch, Legally Blonde, and Bridget Jones's Diary. Date Movie was panned by critics and has a 7% rating on Rotten Tomatoes, but was a box office success, grossing almost $85 million on a $20 million budget.

Plot
Julia Jones is an obese woman who dreams of marrying Napoleon Dynamite, but even in her dreams, she is rejected. Writing in her diary, she thinks she will never find her true love. Julia goes outside and dances to impress men on the streets, but is unsuccessful. Julia goes to work at her father Frank's Greek diner, where she meets and is instantly attracted to Grant Fockyerdoder. When Frank yells at Julia to get an order, she turns to respond and accidentally hits Grant over the head with the coffee pot she is holding, knocking him to the floor. She turns around only to find his table is suddenly empty and figures he ran away. Wanting help, Julia visits a love therapist, Hitch, who initially rejects her but reluctantly agrees to help her, taking her to a garage where she gets "pimped out" and made slimmer.

She earns a spot on a reality television dating show called The Extreme Bachelor: Desperate Edition, the bachelor turning out to be Grant, the man she met in the diner. Host Ty Andrews introduces Grant, who greets all the women and is asked to eliminate the losers, which he does by shooting them one by one. As the last woman standing, Julia is rewarded with dinner for two at a restaurant called "A Restaurant". After their meal, Julia and Grant venture to her apartment, where they have sex. Julia takes Grant to meet her parents.

Later, Grant takes Julia to Tiffany & Co., where they turn on the lights to reveal the salespeople ready to let her pick whatever she wants. Grant then confesses he loves her and proposes to her. Julia happily accepts. The couple then meets with Grant's parents, Bernie and Roz, who recommend they go see a wedding planner, after which Roz reveals that Grant lost his virginity to the housekeeper, Eduardo. Julia and Grant go to the wedding planner named Jell-O, who has massive buttocks. Julia stresses that she wants a traditional wedding, but Jell-O suggests that they go to a restaurant called Taco Butt, which they decline. However, she gets upset and tells them that's the best she can do on short notice. Grant tries to ease the awkward situation by saying he has a best man they will meet up with later, which relaxes Jell-O as she shows them what she has booked for the entertainment. Jell-O uses her butt to knock over her desk, then aggressively rips off her clothes to reveal a gold spandex bra and tights, shocking the couple and revealing that she is the wedding entertainment. She shows off her dance moves until she backs up to them as they scream in fear, while she joyfully crushes & smothers them with her butt, getting even on declining her earlier offer. Grant introduces Julia to his ex-fiancée, Andy, who seemingly harbors no resentment towards Julia for marrying Grant, going so far as to help Julia shop for her wedding dress. At the dress store, Julia hits her head on a power box and finds that she can read people's thoughts. Julia finds from reading Andy's mind that she wants to get back together with Grant and plans to split the two of them up. Julia and Andy fight each other, Kill Bill-style.

On the day of their wedding Julia arrives at the church late, she then witnesses Grant and Andy sharing a kiss (but Julia is unaware that Grant tried to reject Andy's desires to get back together with her) leaving Julia heartbroken. Since she cannot forgive Grant, Julia agrees to marry Nicky. Once at the altar with Nicky, Julia is regretting it and has flashbacks about her and Grant. Frank objects to the union and realizes he was wrong about Grant who liked her even when Julia was ugly, and he persuades her to go after Grant who is revealed to have waited for months. Julia journeys to meet him as he is leaving while tossing aside Andy who was pursuing him too. Julia arrives too late and sees Grant on the streets before she falls off the roof, though Grant conveniently catches her. They get back together and get married, with Hitch officiating and now dating Jell-O. Andy and Nicky meet at the wedding and fall in love. Meanwhile, Grant and Julia leave in a horse and carriage. Roz also gifts her with a vaginal thermometer which apparently has been in their family for generations and is regarded as good luck when kept unwashed.

On their honeymoon, Grant and Julia go to Skull Island and film a woman, Anne, tied to two pieces of wood. After King Kong rips off Anne's dress and gropes her, she says "I like hairy boys", and King Kong roars and flattens her.

Cast

Parodies

Films and TV shows 
 My Big Fat Greek Wedding (2002) (main parody)
 Meet the Parents (2000) and Meet the Fockers (2004) (main parody)
 Bridget Jones's Diary (2001)
 Hitch (2005)
 The Wedding Planner (2001)
 Kill Bill (2003)
 The Lord of the Rings trilogy (2001-2003)
 Mr. & Mrs. Smith (2005)
 When Harry Met Sally... (1989)
 Along Came Polly (2004)
 King Kong (2005)
 Pimp My Ride (2004-2006)
 The 40-Year-Old Virgin (2005)
 Sleepless in Seattle (1993)
 My Best Friend's Wedding (1997)
 Bend It Like Beckham (2002)
 Napoleon Dynamite (2004)
 Sweet Home Alabama (2002)
 Pretty Woman (1990)
 Say Anything... (1989) 
 Dodgeball: A True Underdog Story (2004) 
 Star Wars: Episode III – Revenge of the Sith (2005)
 The Bachelor (2002-present) 
 What Women Want (2000)

 Real-life people 
 Jennifer Lopez
 Paris Hilton
 Britney Spears
 Barbra Streisand
 Michael Jackson

Production
Aaron Seltzer and Jason Friedberg sold an untilted romantic comedy pitch to Regency and became attached to helm it. In June 2005, it was announced Alyson Hannigan and Adam Campbell were to star in the film.

Release
Box office
The film grossed $48,548,426 in the United States and $36,247,230 internationally, adding up to a worldwide gross of $84,795,656.

Critical response
The film did not have advance press screenings. It received unfavorable reviews from critics. On Rotten Tomatoes, the film has an approval rating of 7% based on 90 reviews, with an average rating of 2.9/10. The site's critical consensus states: "In an attempt to parody rom-com clichés, Date Movie ultimately makes a mockery of itself, with juvenile toilet humor and empty pop culture references." The site ranked the film 77th in the 100 worst reviewed films of the 2000s. On Metacritic, the film has a score of 11 based on 18 reviews, indicating "overwhelming dislike". Audiences surveyed by CinemaScore gave the film a grade C+ on scale of A to F.

Owen Gleiberman of Entertainment Weekly awarded the film a B− grade, and compared it to fast food, suggesting that if audiences are "hungry for comedy that's salty and loud," this film might be just what audiences are craving. Variety praised Jennifer Coolidge for providing a few bright moments with a spot-on spoof of Barbra Streisand, but was otherwise unimpressed describing the film as "padded and repetitious".

Critic Scott Tobias of The A.V. Club was amazed that a "joke-a-second comedy" failed to contain a single laugh.

Kyle Smith of the New York Post stated that the film was a "collection of throwaway gags from other movies, a big blue recycling barrel of comedy waiting for the trash collector." He also joked that the reason why it carried a PG-13 rating was "because 13 is the maximum age of those who might find it funny."

Pete Vonder Haar of Film Threat described the film as a contender for the worst of 2006. He walked out of the film after 29 minutes without a single laugh and said he did not feel any guilt about it. He described the laughter of others in the audience as "inexplicable" and wondered if U.S. cinema-going audiences were made up of "deranged howler monkeys".

Accolades
Carmen Electra won the Golden Raspberry Award for Worst Supporting Actress for her performance in this film and Scary Movie 4. At the 2006 Stinkers Bad Movie Awards, Jennifer Coolidge was nominated for Most Annoying Fake Female Accent but lost to Cindy Cheung for Lady in the Water''. However, the film won the awards for Worst Screenplay and Most Painfully Unfunny Comedy.

Home media
The film was released on DVD on May 30, 2006 in rated (83 minutes) and unrated (84 minutes) versions and 1,051,878 units were sold, bringing in $18,777,508 in revenue.

Soundtrack

Track listing
 "Milkshake" – Kelis
 "Party Hard" – The Perceptionists
 "You’re the First, the Last, My Everything" – Barry White
 "Toma" – Pitbull feat. Lil Jon
 "Funhop" – Todd Schietroma
 "Do You Believe in Magic" – The Lovin' Spoonful
 "Too Much Booty (In da Pants)" – Soundmaster T
 "Break it on Down" – Flii Stylz & Tenashus
 "Baby Come Back" – Player (Edit)
 "The Price Is Right (Theme)" – David Kitay
 "Break It Down" – Alana D.
 "Come on Shake" – Classic
 "What Will You Do?" – Sparklemotion
 "Don't Cha" – Pussycat Dolls

See also
 Romantic comedy, the concept being "spoofed" in this film.

References

External links
 
 
 

2006 films
2000s parody films
2006 romantic comedy films
20th Century Fox films
American parody films
American romantic comedy films
Body image in popular culture
Films about obesity
Films directed by Jason Friedberg and Aaron Seltzer
Films scored by David Kitay
Films shot in Los Angeles
Regency Enterprises films
Golden Raspberry Award winning films
2006 directorial debut films
2000s English-language films
2000s American films